The 2006 All-Big Ten Conference football team consists of American football players chosen as All-Big Ten Conference players for the 2006 Big Ten Conference football season.  The conference recognizes two official All-Big Ten selectors: (1) the Big Ten conference coaches selected separate offensive and defensive units and named first- and second-team players (the "Coaches" team); and (2) a panel of sports writers and broadcasters covering the Big Ten also selected offensive and defensive units and named first- and second-team players (the "Media" team).

Offensive selections

Quarterbacks
 Troy Smith, Ohio State (Coaches-1; Media-1) (2006 Heisman Trophy)
 Chad Henne, Michigan (Coaches-2; Media-2)

Running backs
 Mike Hart, Michigan (Coaches-1; Media-1)
 Antonio Pittman, Ohio State (Coaches-1; Media-2)
 P. J. Hill, Wisconsin (Coaches-2; Media-1)
 Tony Hunt, Penn State (Coaches-2; Media-2)

Receivers
 Mario Manningham, Michigan (Coaches-1; Media-2)
 Ted Ginn Jr., Ohio State (Coaches-2; Media-1)
 Dorien Bryant, Purdue (Coaches-2; Media-1)
 Anthony Gonzalez, Ohio State (Coaches-1)
 James Hardy, Indiana (Coaches-2)

Centers
 Doug Datish, Ohio State (Coaches-1; Media-1)
 Mark Bihl, Michigan (Coaches-2; Media-2)

Guards
 T. J. Downing, Ohio State (Coaches-1; Media-1) 
 Mike Jones, Iowa (Coaches-1; Media-2)
 Adam Kraus, Michigan (Coaches-2; Media-1)
 Kyle Cook, Michigan State (Coaches-2)
 Jordan Grimes, Purdue (Media-2)

Tackles
 Jake Long, Michigan (Coaches-1; Media-1)
 Joe Thomas, Wisconsin (Coaches-1; Media-1)
 Levi Brown, Penn State (Coaches-2; Media-2)
 Marshal Yanda, Iowa (Coaches-2)
 Mike Otto, Purdue (Coaches-2)
 Kirk Barton, Ohio State (Media-2)

Tight ends
 Matt Spaeth, Minnesota (Coaches-1; Media-1)
 Scott Chandler, Iowa (Coaches-2)
 Travis Beckum, Wisconsin (Media-2)

Defensive selections

Defensive linemen
 Alan Branch, Michigan (Coaches-1; Media-1)
 LaMarr Woodley, Michigan (Coaches-1; Media-1)
 Quinn Pitcock, Ohio State (Coaches-1; Media-1)
 Anthony Spencer, Purdue (Coaches-1; Media-1)
 Vernon Gholston, Ohio State (Coaches-2; Media-2)
 Jay Alford, Penn State (Coaches-2; Media-2)
 Matt Shaughnessy, Wisconsin (Coaches-2; Media-2)
 David Patterson, Ohio State (Coaches-2)
 Willie Vandesteeg, Minnesota (Media-2)

Linebackers

Defensive backs

Special teams

Kickers
 Garrett Rivas, Michigan (Coaches-1; Media-1)
 Taylor Mehlhaff, Wisconsin (Coaches-2; Media-2)

Punters
 Brandon Fields, Michigan State (Coaches-1; Media-1)
 Jeremy Kapinos, Penn State (Coaches-2; Media-2)

Key
Bold = selected as a first-team player by both the coaches and media panel

Coaches = selected by Big Ten Conference coaches

Media = selected by a media panel

HM = Honorable mention

See also
 2006 College Football All-America Team

References

All-Big Ten Conference
All-Big Ten Conference football teams